The 8th Politburo of the Chinese Communist Party was elected at the 1st Plenary Session of the 8th Central Committee on September 28, 1956, consisting of 17 members and 6 alternate members.  This Politburo was preceded by the 7th Politburo of the Chinese Communist Party. 

There were additions to the membership in 1958 and 1966. During the Cultural Revolution, many members and alternate members fell from power, and the Politburo ceased to function between March, 1967 and April, 1969.  This was because of continuously high cultural tension. 

Once this settled down, the 9th Politburo of the Chinese Communist Party firmly met in a congressional plenum.

Members (17)
Mao Zedong, Chairman of the Party Central Committee and member of the Politburo Standing Committee
Liu Shaoqi, Vice Chairman of the Party Central Committee until August, 1966; member of the Politburo Standing Committee (fell from power in January, 1967; dismissed in October, 1968)
Zhou Enlai, Vice Chairman of the Party Central Committee until August, 1966; member of the Politburo Standing Committee
Zhu De, Vice Chairman of the Party Central Committee until August, 1966; member of the Politburo Standing Committee
Chen Yun, Vice Chairman of the Party Central Committee until August, 1966; member of the Politburo Standing Committee
Deng Xiaoping, General Secretary of the Party Central Committee until August, 1966; member of the Politburo Standing Committee (fell from power in January, 1967)
Lin Biao, elected Vice Chairman of the Party Central Committee and member of the Politburo Standing Committee in May, 1958
Lin Boqu (died in May, 1960)
Dong Biwu
Peng Zhen (fell from power in May, 1966)
Luo Ronghuan (died in December, 1963) 
Chen Yi
Li Fuchun, elected  member of the Politburo Standing Committee in August, 1966
Peng Dehuai (fell from power in August, 1959)
Liu Bocheng
He Long (fell from power in September, 1967)
Li Xiannian

Alternate members (6)
Ulanhu (fell from power in August 1966)
Zhang Wentian (fell from power in August 1959)
Lu Dingyi (fell from power in May 1966)
Chen Boda (until August 1966, when he became a full member and a member of the standing committee)
Kang Sheng (until August 1966, when he became a full member and a member of the standing committee)
Bo Yibo (fell from power in January 1967)

Member elected  in May, 1958 (3)
at the 5th Plenary Session of the 8th Central Committee:
Ke Qingshi (died in April, 1965)
Li Jingquan (fell from power in January, 1967)
Tan Zhenlin (fell from power in August, 1967)

Members elected  in August, 1966 (6)
at the 11th Plenary Session of the 8th Central Committee:
Tao Zhu, elected at the same time member of the Politburo Standing Committee (fell from power in January, 1967)
Chen Boda, elected at the same time member of the Politburo Standing Committee (previously alternate member)
Kang Sheng, elected at the same time member of the Politburo Standing Committee (previously alternate member)
Xu Xiangqian
Nie Rongzhen
Ye Jianying

Alternate members elected  in August, 1966 (3)
at the 11th Plenary Session of the 8th Central Committee:
Li Xuefeng
Xie Fuzhi
Song Renqiong (fell from power in August, 1967)

References

External links 
  Gazette of the 1st Session of the 8th CCP Central Committee

Politburo of the Chinese Communist Party
1956 in China